The Star Lake Hydroelectric Generating Station is a hydroelectric generating plant located at Star Lake in central Newfoundland.  The plant is owned by Newfoundland and Labrador Hydro, and was first synchronized in 1998.  It operates with a single vertical Francis turbine with a 450 ft head and a 173 million cubic metre capacity storage reservoir to generate 18.4 MW of electrical power.

Hydroelectric power stations in Newfoundland and Labrador
Dams in Newfoundland and Labrador
Newfoundland and Labrador Hydro